Holm Church is a parish church of the Church of Norway in Rauma Municipality in Møre og Romsdal county, Norway. It is located in the village of Holm, about half way between the villages of Åfarnes and Mittet. It is one of the churches for the Eid og Holm parish which is part of the Indre Romsdal prosti (deanery) in the Diocese of Møre. The red, wooden church was built in a long church design and in the dragestil style in 1907 using plans drawn up by the architect Karl Norum. The church seats about 220 people.

History
The people of the Holm area were part of the Old Veøy Church parish for centuries. On 14 May 1901, a royal resolution separated it out as its own parish. Soon after, plans were made to build a new, large church in Holm. Karl Norum was hired to design the new church. It was manufactured and partially built in a factory setting and then its parts were somewhat disassembled and shipped to the building site.

Media gallery

See also
List of churches in Møre

References

Rauma, Norway
Churches in Møre og Romsdal
Long churches in Norway
Wooden churches in Norway
20th-century Church of Norway church buildings
Churches completed in 1907
1907 establishments in Norway
National Romantic architecture in Norway
Art Nouveau church buildings in Norway